Lieksa-Nurmes Airfield is an airfield in Lieksa, Finland, about  east of Nurmes town centre and about  northwest of Lieksa town centre.

See also
List of airports in Finland

References

External links
 VFR Suomi/Finland – Lieksa-Nurmes Airfield
 Lentopaikat.net – Lieksa-Nurmes Airfield 

Airports in Finland
Airfield
Buildings and structures in North Karelia